Lesbian, gay, bisexual, and transgender (LGBT) people in Texas have some protections in state law but may face legal and social challenges not faced by others. Same-sex sexual activity was decriminalized in the state in 2003 by the Lawrence v. Texas ruling. On June 26, 2015, the Supreme Court of the United States ruled bans on same-sex marriage to be unconstitutional in Obergefell v. Hodges. 

Texas has a hate crime statute that strengthens penalties for certain crimes motivated by a victim's sexual orientation, although crimes are rarely prosecuted under the statute. The law does not cover gender identity. While some localities in Texas have ordinances that provide a variety of legal protections and benefits to LGBT people, Texas has had no statewide law banning anti-LGBT discrimination. The federal protections against employment discrimination based on sexual orientation or gender identity, established in 2020 by several landmark cases, apply in Texas. 

A majority of Texans support same-sex marriage and anti-discrimination laws for LGBT people.

Laws regarding same-sex sexual activity

Until the U. S. Supreme Court in June 2003 declared sodomy laws unconstitutional in Lawrence v. Texas. Sodomy was a criminal offense in Texas, termed "deviate sexual intercourse". As of January 2018, Texas was one of the three states to still have statutes criminalizing same-sex sexual acts, alongside both Oklahoma and Kansas. The Legislature has failed to pass several proposed bills that would repeal the Texas statutes.

Recognition of same-sex relationships

Marriage

On June 26, 2015, the United States legalized same-sex marriage nationwide due to the U.S. Supreme Court's decision in Obergefell v. Hodges. In September 2015, it was reported that 2,500 same-sex marriage licenses had been issued in the state since June.

History
The first legal challenge to Texas' ban on marriage between two people of the same sex came in 1972 when Travis Co Attorney Ned Granger requested an opinion from Attorney General Crawford Martin on the legality of issuing such licenses. Martin issued an opinion that, despite the lack of a specific prohibition against same-sex marriage in statute, it was not legally permitted. In 1973, the Texas Family Code was amended by House Bill 103 to explicitly state that a marriage license may only be issued to a man and a woman. HB 103 became effective on January 1, 1974.

In 1997, Texas banned the issuance of marriage licenses to same-sex couples. Additional 
legislation in 2003 forbade the recognition of any same-sex marriages or civil unions. In 2005, voters approved a referendum that added those restrictions to the Texas Constitution.

On February 26, 2014, Judge Orlando Luis Garcia, of the United States District Court for the Western District of Texas, found that Texas's ban on same-sex marriage was unconstitutional. On April 23, 2014, Judge Barbara Nellermoe, of the 45th Judicial District Court of Bexar County, found that Texas's ban on same-sex marriage was unconstitutional. Both cases were appealed by Texas Attorney General Greg Abbott.

In February 2015, two state judges in Travis County held the state's ban on same-sex marriage unconstitutional. One ordered the recognition of a common-law marriage between two women and the other order the county clerk to issue a marriage license to two women. They obtained their license and wed before Attorney General Ken Paxton obtained stays from the Texas Supreme Court and asked that court to void the marriage license.

Domestic partner benefits

Same sex-marriages have been recognized throughout the state since 2015. Currently, there is no recognition of domestic partnerships at the statewide level in Texas for either same-sex or opposite-sex couples. 

Austin, Dallas, Fort Worth, El Paso, Houston, and San Antonio provide health insurance to domestic partners of city workers. In 2001, 52% of Houston voters approved Proposition 2, an amendment to the city charter prohibiting the city from providing domestic partner benefits for city employees. The amendment, however, specifically permits benefits to be provided to "legal spouses" of employees, and in November 2013, the city's legal department determined it would be unlawful to continue to deny spousal benefits for legally married same-sex couples.

The Pflugerville Independent School District allows domestic partners of district workers to be included in the district's health insurance plan, although the workers must pay the entire cost of the coverage as they do for any dependent.

Dallas County pays cash subsidies to help cover the cost of individual insurance policies purchased by the domestic partners of county employees. The amount of the subsidy is the same as the amount the county contributes to the group insurance plan that covers county employees, which in October 2012 was $300 per month. The county was unable to add the domestic partners to the group plan because the two other counties participating in the plan, Denton and Tarrant, opposed it.

Travis County allows the domestic partners of county employees to participate as dependents in the county's group insurance plan.

El Paso County provides health benefits to unmarried partners of county employees.

Bexar County allows county employee benefits to be extended to domestic partners.

2013 Texas Attorney General opinion

In April 2013, Texas Attorney General Greg Abbott, provided his legal opinion that the Texas Constitution prohibits a political subdivision of the state from providing benefits based on a status like "domestic partnership" because it is "similar to marriage". In response, officials in Travis County and Fort Worth defended the legality of their domestic partnership benefits, as did those in other jurisdictions who minimized the significance of the opinion. The Austin Independent School District decided in June 2013 not to offer health benefits to the domestic partners of its employees, but changed its position in August 2013.

Family and relationship policy

Adoption and parenting
In Texas, any adult may adopt a child without regard to the adult's sexual orientation or gender identity. According to the advocacy organizations, the Family Equality Council and Equality Texas and the non-profit legal services provider Texas Legal Services Center, same-sex couples are able to adopt as a couple if they are legally married. Supplemental birth certificates are issued or amended with the names of the same-sex couple shown as parents. However, adoption agencies, even those with federal funding, are permitted to discriminate against prospective adoptive parents in accord with the religious beliefs of the agency. Lesbian couples can access in vitro fertilization and assisted insemination treatment. However, the state's requirement for health plans to cover IVF includes severe restrictions, “The fertilization or attempted fertilization of the patient’s oocytes is made only with the sperm of the patient’s spouse,” that reduce their access to assisted reproduction.

History
Texas statutes have never prohibited same-sex second-parent adoptions or adoption by a same-sex couple and state courts occasionly approved such adoptions, pre-Obergefell v. Hodges. However, such couples were at that time required to adopt as two single people jointly adopting the same child. The Texas Courts of Appeals concluded in 2009 that a lower court's approval of an adoption by a same-sex couple did not represent a "fundamental error". On November 15, 2012, Representative Rafael Anchia introduced House Bill 201 to the Legislature's 2013 regular session. The bill would have deleted the prohibition against issuing a supplemental birth certificate for a child adopted by two men or two women. The bill died in the Judiciary and Civil Jurisprudence committee of the House of Representatives.

Following the Obergefell v. Hodges ruling that compels recognition of same-sex marriage in all states, legally married couples, whether of the same- or opposite-sex, are equally eligible to be considered as adoptive parents, and the prohibition on issuance of supplemtary birth certificates listing two men or two women as parents ceased on June 26, 2015.

Discrimination protections

Texas courts

In March 2021, Texas courts have fully recognised that LGBT individuals have employment protections, based on the 2020 Bostock v. Clayton County Supreme Court of the United States (SCOTUS) legal precedent. More recently, Texas is a plaintiff in a federal lawsuit to overturn some LGBT protections on Constitutional grounds.

State law
, no Texas state law protects employees from discrimination based on their sexual orientation or gender identity. Since at least 1999, no bill prohibiting discrimination by employers based on sexual orientation or gender identity has made it out of the committee stage in the Texas Legislature. During the Legislature's 2013 regular session, House Bill 238 introduced by Representative Mike Villarreal, House Bill 1146 introduced by Representative Eric Johnson, and Senate Bill 237 introduced by Senator Leticia Van de Putte would have prohibited this kind of discrimination; however, all these bills died in their respective committees. Judge Lee Rosenthal of the Southern District Court of Texas has ruled that sexual orientation and gender identity fall under Federal Protections. However, in April 2018, a federal judge of the U.S. District Court for the Southern District of Texas ruled that, although a woman hadn't proven she had been discriminated against for being transgender by the company Phillips 66, if that had been proven, then the woman would have "had a case" under Title VII of the Civil Rights Act of 1964. The judge, who had been appointed by President George H. W. Bush in 1992, cited other recent cases as shaping the final decision.

Texas state law does not protect persons from housing or public accommodations discrimination based on their sexual orientation or gender identity or expression. House Bill 2215 introduced by Representative Jessica Farrar in the Legislature's 2009 regular session would have prohibited this kind of discrimination; however, the bill died in the Judiciary and Civil Jurisprudence committee of the House of Representatives.

Texas state law also does not protect persons from insurance discrimination based on their sexual orientation or gender identity or expression. During the Legislature's 2013 regular session, House Bill 206 introduced by Representative Senfronia Thompson, House Bill 541 introduced by Representative Robert Alonzo, and Senate Bill 73 introduced by Senator Rodney Ellis would have prohibited this kind of discrimination; however, all these bills died in their respective committees.

Religious freedom bills

In June 2019, a religious freedom bill, Prohibited Adverse Actions by Government (Protection of Membership in and Support to Religious Organizations), often referred to by media as the "Save Chick-fil-A' bill", was passed by the Texas Legislature. The act, SB 1978, prohibits any government, or government agency, from treating adversely anyone who supports any religious organization, which may include organizations that refuse service to members of the LGBTQ community, or those that campaign against equality measures or policy.

As originally introduced in the senate, the bill had far broader provisions. For example, Section 2400.002 of the unamended version, filed by Bryan Hughes included direct mention of "beliefs regarding marriage" as protected; the bill as passed was amended to exclude that specification. The final bill also dispensed with language that referred to individuals' "sincerely held" beliefs or convictions; instead, the enacted version enumerates ties to or support of religious organizations.

The enacted bill differed substantively from the original, unpassed version of § 2400.002. An example of the difference between versions is shown below (unenacted version, in italics; enrolled version, as passed, in roman text): 
 Emma Platoff, writing in the Texas Tribune, considered that the amended bill only restated existing protections for freedom of religion and association, saying: 

The LGBT caucus in the Texas House of Representatives worked to reduce the possible impact of the bill. In addition to removal of any reference to "marriage beliefs", and the substitution of objective associations with religious organizations for less-definable subjective "beliefs" or "convictions", opposing members achieved a further concession: A provision which would have allowed the Attorney General prosecutorial powers over government entities alleged to have contravened the bill was also removed. According to a 2019 report from TIME, the efforts of Democrats and the LGBT caucus rendered the bill much less threatening to LGBT rights than in its original design: "The new version of the bill essentially restates already-existing legal protections for freedom of religion and freedom of association," the Time reporter writes. Time also reports Texas House Rep. Jessica González, a Democrat and LGBT caucus member, as saying, "By the time the bill passed on Tuesday, it was mostly stripped of language that could have reduced LGBTQ rights." Nevertheless, González noted that, "Ultimately, the bill was born out of intolerance" and "It gives people the license to discriminate."

Counties with LGBT protections

Cities with LGBT protections

The following Texas cities have ordinances prohibiting discrimination on the basis of sexual orientation and gender identity in housing, public accommodations, city employment, private employment and city contractors.

Austin, Dallas, Fort Worth, Plano and San Antonio prohibit discrimination on the basis of sexual orientation and gender identity in private and public employment, housing and public accommodations.

Denton has protections for sexual orientation and gender identity for city employment and city contractors.

El Paso has protections based on sexual orientation and gender identity for public accommodations and city employment.

Arlington, Brownsville, Corpus Christi, Houston, Irving, Lubbock, Mesquite and Waco have protections based on sexual orientation and gender identity for city employment—including city contractors in some cities—only. Houston previously had wide-ranging antidiscrimination measures that also covered residents and visitors, introduced in 2014, but these were soon repealed by voters in 2015.

Grand Prairie, McAllen, and Round Rock have a city policy prohibiting city employment discrimination on the basis of sexual orientation only.

Status of non-discrimination protections in Texas' top 20 cities

School districts with LGBT inclusive policies
The following school districts have both employee welfare and student welfare policies prohibiting discrimination based on sexual orientation, gender identity, and gender expression:  and Houston ISD.

El Paso ISD has similar protections, worded as "gender stereotyping and perceived sexuality."

Cedar Hill ISD has protections for sexual orientation only.

Pflugerville ISD has explicit protections for employees only, but these same explicit protections are missing from the student non-discrimination policy.

University LGBT non-discrimination policies

Sexual orientation, gender identity and gender expression
The following universities have non-discrimination policies for students and employees based on sexual orientation, gender identity and gender expression

Sexual orientation and gender identity

Sexual orientation
The following universities have non-discrimination policies for students and employees based on sexual orientation only:

On-campus housing
The following universities have non-discrimination statements for sexual orientation for on-campus housing:  

The following universities have non-discrimination statements for roommate selection and roommate requests based on sexual orientation:

Discrimination in Texas

Gender identity discrimination
In response to a national 2010 survey, 79% of Texans felt that these people were experiencing harassment or mistreatment at work, and 45% reported that they were not hired, 26% reported that they were fired, and 22% reported being denied a promotion because of their gender identity or expression.

Public opinion on non-discrimination laws
Aggregated data from two large public opinion polls find that 79% of Texas residents think that LGBT people experience a moderate amount to a lot of discrimination in the state.

In response to a national poll conducted in 2011, 73% of respondents from Texas said that employment discrimination based on sexual orientation and gender identity should be prohibited in the U.S.

Gender identity and expression

Birth certificates 
For transgender people to change their legal gender on their birth certificate, Texas requires that the individual has received "appropriate treatment" and a finding that “it is in your best interest.. that your sex and/or gender marker be changed in public records” from a licensed physician.

Gender change records sought by Attorney General 
In December 2022, it was reported by the Washington Post that the Attorney General's office had requested a full list of all gender changes on Texas driver's licenses and other department records. The Texas Department of Public Safety (DPS) were asked to provide the "total number of changes from male to female and female to male for the last 24 months [prior to June 2022], broken down by month" according to inter-departmental messages obtained by The Post.  The DPS search resulted in more than 16,000 instances, but the department could not accurately determine the reasons for the marker changes without manually searching the records: Results included instances of changes due to error corrections, for example, and no method existed to extract records solely altered due to gender change, except by manual review of all related documentation. 

A DPS spokesperson advised The Post that, therefore, "Ultimately, our team advised the AG's office the data requested neither exists nor could be accurately produced. Thus, no data of any kind was provided." The procedure followed to obtain these data did not conform to normal practise, according to the Washington Post. The newspaper's information is that usual channels for such requests were bypassed by going directly to driver license division staff. According to a state employee who spoke to The Post, DPS staff were told that "Paxton's office wanted 'numbers' and later would want 'a list' of names, as well as 'the number of people who had had a legal sex change.'"

Gender-affirming healthcare for minors 
In May 2021, although an effort to ban gender-affirming healthcare for minors (House Bill 1399) missed its legislative deadline in the House, a similar bill (Senate Bill 1311) was passed by the Senate in an 18–13 vote. If it becomes law, it would revoke the medical license of any doctor who provides gender-affirming healthcare, including puberty blockers, to minors. The bill could still be passed through a "special legislative session" but would require two-thirds of the vote to pass.

In February 2022, Texas Attorney General Ken Paxton issued a legal opinion that gender affirming care for transgender youth was child abuse under state law. After this, Texas Governor Greg Abbott told medical professionals and members of the public to report any transgender youth who received such care and called on the Texas Department of Family and Protective Services to investigate parents for child abuse if they helped their kids receive gender affirming care, with "criminal penalties" for those who knowingly fail to report. After this, five District Attorneys said they would not be following the order. The ACLU and Lambda Legal sued over the order and many medical groups have condemned it. In March 2022, the Texas Third Court of Appeals reinstated a temporary injunction barring enforcement of Abbott's directive. 	
 The ACLU has sued over this action on behalf of a family being investigated.

Randy Mulanax, investigative supervisor with the Texas DFPS, testified in court that cases regarding trans children were being subject to different rules than other cases, with investigation of any child reported, regardless of evidence, being mandatory, and investigators being prohibited from discussing the case over email or text. 

In July 2022, the state of Texas hired Dr. James Cantor as an expert witness in defense of a directive from Texas Governor Greg Abbott barring minors from receiving gender-affirming care. The suit was supported by LGBT advocacy group PFLAG. According to an article in the Houston Chronicle, Cantor said that for minors experiencing gender dysphoria, the condition may desist and they may become cisgender gay or lesbian people. The attorneys for the plaintiffs objected saying that the studies referred to "tomboys" and "effeminate" youth. They further argued that Cantor lacked practical experience treating minors with gender dysphoria, and most of the studies he cited were published before 1988.

Marriage and gender identity 
In 2009, the Texas Legislature authorized a court order relating to a person's sex change to be acceptable proof of identity for a marriage license.

For geographical areas under the jurisdiction of the Texas Court of Appeals in San Antonio, the 1999 case Littleton v. Prange defined that, for purposes of determining the validity of a marriage, a person's sex is determined at birth and is not changed by surgery or drug therapy. This ruling allowed a person born male who transitioned to female to marry a woman in that court's jurisdiction. In February 2014, the Texas Court of Appeals in Corpus Christi held that state law had changed since Littleton and now recognized sex reassignment, so that parties to a lawsuit contesting whether or not a marriage was an invalid same-sex marriage or a valid different-sex marriage needed to have their dispute heard by a trial court.

Transgender people in the performing arts
A bill which, if passed, will widen the definition of "sexually oriented businesses" (SOBs) was prefiled in the Texas legislature in November 2022. The intent of HB 643, according to the filing member Rep. Jared Patterson, is to criminalize allowing minors to attend drag shows, but the new, broader definitions of "sexually oriented businesses" contained in the bill will capture a range of public performances other than "drag shows". They will, in addition, also restrict access to any entertainment where, either, transgender persons perform in any role, or cisgender persons depict characters of diverse or ambiguous genders, such as occurs in many traditional theatrical productions. This is because the bill covers any performance where a performer uses "clothing, makeup, or other physical markers" to "exhibit a gender" at variance from the one assigned to them at birth and also "sings, lip syncs, dances, or otherwise performs" in front of an audience. As currently defined, SOBs are businesses where anyone performs nude, as in, for example, "strip shows".

Transgender sports restrictions

In October 2021, the Texas Legislature passed a bill,  HB25, to legally ban transgender individuals within any female sports, Olympics, or athletics teams. The Governor of Texas Greg Abbott signed the bill into law, which went into legal effect from January 18, 2022.

The bill requires that students enrolled in public schools may only participate in athletic competitions within the sex (or "gender") category they were assigned at birth. This means that if the officially registered sex at birth differs from one's gender identity and expression, an individual may not participate in events or in teams of that gender identity, but only in those for their "original" sex. The restriction applies in all public schools from Kindergarten to 12th grade in Texas.

The stated intention of the bill is fairness in school sports by preventing any physical advantage that transgender students may have. Possible advantages of concern are stated, for example, as a competitor having  biological male sex, with likely increased muscle mass and strength, compared to the average competitor of female sex, but competing as a female. In this way—proponents of the bill believe—the transgender individual would have an unfair advantage. Against this, the higher production of testosterone that promotes greater muscle and bone mass does not commence until adolescence, before which there is negligible sex-based group differences between boys and girls, in terms of speed, strength, stamina and other sports-related traits. Such secondary sex characteristics do not necessarily confer advantages in all sports. Additionally, while feminizing hormone therapy itself dramatically reduces testosterone, anti-androgen medication is often used in conjunction with estrogen to suppress masculinizing effects, which leads to decreases in muscle mass.

The HB25 bill is more extensive than existing University Interscholastic League (UIL) rules which has the similar requirement of students only being allowed to participate in athletic competitions with the same group of assigned sex. However, the UIL rule accepts amended birth certificates, which allows transgender people to participate with the opposite sex  if in their official certificate it has changed. HB25 has no written guidance on how schools are to carry out and enforce the bill, but language in the bill directs to the UIL to create said process. UIL's language upholds Title IX, the federal law that prohibits any discrimination based on sex.

Other legal and policy issues

Hate crime law
On May 11, 2001, Governor Rick Perry signed House Bill 587, popularly but unofficially known as the James Byrd Jr. Hate Crimes Act, which strengthened penalties for certain crimes motivated by a victim's race, color, disability, religion, national origin or ancestry, age, gender, or sexual preference. This legislation did not cover gender identity.

In the first decade after the law took effect on September 1, 2001, local law enforcement agencies had reported about 200 crimes per year as hate crimes. However, fewer than one case a year on average had been successfully prosecuted in Texas as a hate crime. This is among the states with the lowest percentage of prosecuted hate crimes.

Romeo and Juliet law
Texas provides an affirmative defense to a person who has engaged in unlawful sexual contact with a child under 17 years of age, if the person is not more than three years older than the child, so long as the person is not of the child's same sex. There has been no published constitutional challenge of this statute since the 2015 U.S. Supreme Court ruling in Obergefell v. Hodges, in which the court held that same-sex marriage bans breach the Equal Protection Clause of the Fourteenth Amendment to the U.S. Constitution. Texas has been the only state to maintain such a distinction on its books since the Kansas Supreme Court found a similar Kansas statute to be unconstitutional in 2005. During the Legislature's 2013 regular session, House Bill 2403, introduced by Representative Mary González, House Bill 3322, introduced by Representative Coleman, and Senate Bill 1316, introduced by Senator John Whitmire, would have repealed this distinction; however, none of these bills was passed by its chamber of origin.

Sex education
The Texas Department of State Health Services has developed model education programs on AIDS and HIV; however, Texas law requires that the "materials in the education programs intended for persons younger than 18 years of age ...  state that homosexual conduct is not an acceptable lifestyle and is a criminal offense...." In practice, few school districts include that language about homosexual conduct in their sex education materials. This law also has not been modified since Lawrence v. Texas.
 
In November 2020, the Texas Board of Education had an opportunity to update this policy, but the Republican majority voted not to in a 10-5 vote. Despite this, they did vote in favor of updating the anti-bullying policy to include language about "sexual bullying", although it was unclear if this included LGBT students or not, and when the Conservative board members were questioned what the term meant, they could not give a straight definition.

, the Texas "no promo homo law" still remains on the statute books.

Social workers
In October 2020, a new "internal policy" and regulation within Texas allows discrimination against LGBT individuals and individuals with a disability who are clients.

On February 23, 2022, Texas Governor Greg Abbott signed an order to direct the Texas Department of Family and Protective Services to investigate providing gender-affirming healthcare to transgender people under 18 as child abuse. He also encouraged licensed professionals who work with children and the general public to report the parents of transgender youth. On March 1, 2022, the American Civil Liberties Union (ACLU), the ACLU of Texas and Lambda Legal filed a lawsuit to block the directive on the behalf of Dr. Megan Mooney, a clinical psychologist, and an anonymous family containing two supportive parents and a 16-year-old transgender girl who was being treated with puberty blockers to prevent gender dysphoria.

Stance on LGBT support organizations 
In February 2022, the Texas Department of Health and Human Services removed a listing for The Trevor Project, a national organization for LGBT youth, from its online suicide prevention resources.

Politics

The Texas Republican Party holds all statewide offices in Texas, controls both houses of the Texas Legislature as well as the Governor of Texas (known as the government trifecta). Its 2012 party platform contained numerous statements against LGBT rights. Even the Texas Republican Party has made statements supporting the Russian gay propaganda law.

Republican Governor Rick Perry signed a pledge from the National Organization for Marriage to oppose same-sex marriage; Perry also dismissed the Lawrence v. Texas U. S. Supreme Court decision as the product of "nine oligarchs in robes".

The Texas Democratic Party added certain LGBT rights to the party's platform in 1980, and included same-sex marriage rights in its 2012 platform, becoming the first Democratic state party in the southern United States to do so.

Legislative proposals
According to the Texas Tribune, around fifty bills "targeting LGBTQ people" had been filed by Texas lawmakers by early January 2023 for the new legislative session. The range of bills filed cover several aspects that may affect LGBT rights. These include measures: criminalizing provision of gender-affirming health care to minors; restricting public performances that include performers deemed to be displaying markers or behavior deemed appropriate for a sex other than the one assigned to them at birth; disallowing any alteration of sex (gender) marker on official documents for minors; and further restricting participation in sports for transsexual or gender non-conforming people.

Public opinion

Since 2009, Texans between the ages of 18 and 29 have increasingly supported same-sex marriage at a faster rate than that of the general population. In June 2009, the University of Texas found that 49% of that age group supported same-sex marriage as opposed to 29% of the general population. In February 2013, it found that 59% of them did so, while only 37% of the general population had the same opinion. Opposition from Texans between the ages of 18 and 29 dropped 12 points in the same period, from 28 to 16%. At the same time, opposition from the general population in Texan dropped 5 points, from 52.7% to 47.5%. Glengariff Group, Inc., in conjunction with the pro-LGBT rights Equality Texas Foundation, found that support in that age group rose from 53.6% in 2010 to 67.9% in 2013, while within the general population in Texas, support rose from 42.7% to 47.9%.

Later polls have found that a majority of Texans support same-sex marriage. A 2017 Public Religion Research Institute poll, for example, showed support for same-sex marriage in Texas at 55%. 34% were opposed and 11% were unsure.

Support organizations

Transgender Education Network of Texas
The Transgender Education Network of Texas (TENT) works to further gender diversity equity in the U.S. state of Texas. As of 2016, the organization was registered as a 501(c)(3) not-for-profit organization in the United States.

TENT was founded in 2002 as the Austin Transgender Ordinance Initiative. TENT's main work is in education, advocacy, and empowerment, and it works in both public and private forums to prevent discrimination against transgender, non-binary, and intersex people in Texas. It also supports pro-transgender legislation in Texas.

TENT is a member of the Austin GLBT Chamber of Commerce. In community advocacy, it partners with other organizations such as the American Civil Liberties Union (ACLU) of Texas, Anti-Defamation League of Central Texas, Equality Texas, Human Rights Campaign and the Texas Freedom Network.

In addition to offering "cultural competency" seminars, workshops and presentations itself to a variety of organizations, TENT has also collaborated with other research and education initiatives. One such research collaboration aimed to understand and improve the education of transgender-related health topics within Texas nursing programs' curricula.

One of the organization's primary focuses has been collecting the testimonies of transgender, non-binary, and intersex people and their allies in Texas. Many of these testimonies were collected specifically in reaction to the proposal of Texas SB6, a "bathroom bill" intending to limit bathroom access based on the sex listed on one's birth certificate. The organization maintains a record of testimony provided to the Texas State Senate's committee of State Affairs regarding SB6 by transgender, non-binary, and intersex people and their allies on its website.

In March 2018, as part of a coalition with ACLU of Texas, Equality Texas, and Lambda Legal, TENT created TxTransKids.org, a support network and resource center for elementary and high school transgender students and their families.

Summary table

See also

 Equality Texas
 LGBT rights in the United States
 LGBT rights by country or territory
 List of U.S. state constitutional amendments banning same-sex unions by type
 Law of Texas
 LGBT culture in Dallas-Fort Worth
 LGBT culture in Houston
 No promo homo laws, also known as the Don't Say Gay law

Notes

References

Further reading
 
 "Understanding Transgender Marriage in Texas Law", ONTD Political, August 19, 2010
 "Does Texas Allow Transgender Marriages?", The Houston Family Law Blog, authored by Laura Fishman, May 7, 2010
 "Texas and the Hate Crimes Act", Daily Kos, October 28, 2009
 The Sensibilities of Our Forefathers: The History of Sodomy Laws in the United States - Texas, by George Painter

External links
 Equality Texas
 
 Transgender Education Network of Texas
 Texas Wins Campaign
 Stonewall Democrats - Texas

Rights
Texas
Politics of Texas
Texas law